Demetrida parena is a species of ground beetle in Lebiinae subfamily. It was described by Darlington in 1971 and is found in Indonesia and New Guinea.

References

Beetles described in 1971
Beetles of Papua New Guinea
Beetles of Indonesia
parena